William Broderick Crawford (December 9, 1911 – April 26, 1986) was an American stage, film, radio, and television actor, often cast in tough-guy roles and best known for his Oscar- and Golden Globe-winning portrayal of Willie Stark in All the King's Men (1949) and for his starring role as Dan Mathews in the television series Highway Patrol (1955–1959). Until filming All the King's Men, Crawford's career had been largely limited to "B films" in supporting or character roles.

Early life
Crawford was born in Philadelphia, Pennsylvania, to Lester Crawford ( Lester Crawford Pendergast) and Helen Broderick, who were both vaudeville performers, as his grandparents had been. Lester appeared in films in the 1920s and 1930s. Helen Broderick had a career in Hollywood comedies, including memorable appearances in the Fred Astaire and Ginger Rogers musicals Top Hat and Swing Time.

Young William joined his parents on the stage, working for producer Max Gordon. After graduating from preparatory high school Dean Academy (now Dean College) in Franklin, Massachusetts, Crawford was accepted by Harvard College where he enrolled. However, after only three weeks at Harvard he dropped out to work as a stevedore on the New York docks.

Acting career

Crawford returned to vaudeville and radio, which included a period with the Marx Brothers in the radio comedy show Flywheel, Shyster, and Flywheel.

He played his first serious character as a footballer in She Loves Me Not at the Adelphi Theatre, London in 1932. Crawford was originally stereotyped as a fast-talking tough guy early in his career and often played villainous parts.

He gained fame in 1937 as Lenny in Of Mice and Men on Broadway. He moved to Hollywood and began working in films.

Early films
Crawford made his film debut for Sam Goldwyn in Woman Chases Man (1937). He was in Start Cheering (1938) at Columbia but missed out on reprising his stage performance as Lenny in the film version of Of Mice and Men, losing it to Lon Chaney Jr.

Paramount

Crawford signed a contract with Paramount. He appeared in some "B" films: Ambush (1939), Sudden Money (1939) and Undercover Doctor (1939). He had a good role in the prestigious Beau Geste with Gary Cooper, Ray Milland, Robert Preston, Brian Donlevy and Susan Hayward and directed by William A. Wellman.

After appearing in Island of Lost Men (1939) starring Anna May Wong, Crawford had a Beau Geste-style role in The Real Glory (1939) with Gary Cooper and David Niven. He appeared in two films for Walter Wanger and Tay Garnett, Eternally Yours (1939) with David Niven and Loretta Young and Slightly Honorable (1939) with Pat O'Brien and Edward Arnold.

Universal
Crawford moved over to Universal, where he was given his first starring role, in the "B" picture I Can't Give You Anything But Love, Baby (1940).

He had support parts in When the Daltons Rode (1940); Seven Sinners (1940), for Garnett; and Trail of the Vigilantes (1940). He went back to Paramount for Texas Rangers Ride Again (1940) then returned to Universal for The Black Cat (1941), Tight Shoes (1941), and Badlands of Dakota (1941).

Crawford had one of the leads in South of Tahiti (1941) and North to the Klondike (1941). He supported Edward G. Robinson in Larceny, Inc. (1942) and George Raft in Broadway (1942), and co-starred with Robert Stack in Men of Texas (1942) and Constance Bennett in Sin Town (1942).

During World War II, Crawford enlisted in the United States Army Air Corps. Assigned to the Armed Forces Network, he was sent to Britain in 1944 as a sergeant, he served as an announcer for the Glenn Miller American Band. He was one of two announcers on Miller's weekly program I Sustain the Wings, prior to Miller and the band being shipped to England.

He returned to films with roles in the film noir Black Angel (1946) with Dan Duryea and Peter Lorre and Slave Girl (1947) with Yvonne de Carlo.

Freelance actor
Crawford made The Flame (1947) for Republic, and The Time of Your Life (1948) for James Cagney's company. He went back to Paramount for Sealed Verdict (1948) and had a co-starring role in Bad Men of Tombstone (1949) for the King Brothers.

At Warner Bros Crawford was in A Kiss in the Dark (1949) with David Niven and Jane Wyman and Night Unto Night (1949) with Ronald Reagan and Viveca Lindfors. He was also in Monogram's Anna Lucasta (1949) with Paulette Goddard.

All the King's Men and stardom

In 1949, Crawford reached the pinnacle of his acting career when he was cast as Willie Stark, a character inspired by and closely patterned after the life of Louisiana politician Huey Long, in All the King's Men, a film based on the popular novel by Robert Penn Warren. The film was a huge hit, and Crawford's performance as the bullying, blustering, yet insecure Governor Stark won him the Academy Award for Best Actor.

The film was made by Columbia who put Crawford under contract. He co-starred with Glenn Ford in Convicted (1950), then starred in another hit 'A'-list production with William Holden and Judy Holliday, Born Yesterday (1950), directed by George Cukor.

Crawford starred in The Mob (1951), a crime drama. Under the direction of Phil Karlson he starred in Scandal Sheet (1952), based on a novel by Sam Fuller.

MGM borrowed him to play the villain in Lone Star (1952), opposite Clark Gable and Ava Gardner. He went to Warner Bros. to star in a comedy, Stop, You're Killing Me (1952).

Crawford returned to Columbia to star in some Westerns, Last of the Comanches (1953), and The Last Posse (1954). 20th Century Fox borrowed him to co-star with Gregory Peck in Nunnally Johnson's Night People (1954).

Crawford was reunited with Glenn Ford in Human Desire (1954), directed by Fritz Lang. Edward Small used him in Down Three Dark Streets (1954) and New York Confidential (1955).

In 1955, Crawford assumed the starring role as Rollo Lamar, the most violent of convicts in Big House, U.S.A.. In the film, Crawford's character is a hardened convict so violent he commands the obedience of even the most violent and psychotic prisoners in the prison yard, including those portrayed by such famous tough-guy actors as Charles Bronson, Ralph Meeker, William Talman, and Lon Chaney Jr.

Stanley Kramer cast him in a good supporting role in Not as a Stranger (1955) with Robert Mitchum and Frank Sinatra, which was a big hit. He received an offer in Italy to star in Il bidone (1955), directed by Federico Fellini.

Highway Patrol
In 1955, television producer Frederick Ziv of ZIV Television Productions offered Crawford the lead role as "Dan Mathews" in the police drama Highway Patrol, which dramatized law enforcement activities of the California Highway Patrol (CHP). ZIV Television Productions operated on an extremely low budget of $25,000 per episode of Highway Patrol with ten percent of gross receipts going to Crawford as per his contract. While the show's scripts were largely fictional, the use of realistic, rapid-fire dialogue, stark film noir styled feel and Crawford's convincing portrayal of a hard-as-nails police official helped make the show an instant success. Highway Patrol remained popular during its four years (1955–1959) of first-run syndication, and would continue in repeat syndication on local stations across the United States for many years after. For much of the period from 1955 until 1965 most of Crawford's television roles involved ZIV Television, which was among the relative handful of producers willing to accept the frequent challenges inherent with working with the hard-living and alcoholic Crawford. Years later, Frederick Ziv admitted in an interview, "To be honest, Broderick could be a handful!"

Highway Patrol helped revive Crawford's career and cement his tough-guy persona, which he used successfully in numerous movie and TV roles for the rest of his life.

During the series' run he appeared in The Fastest Gun Alive (1956) with Ford at MGM, a successful Western; Between Heaven and Hell (1956) with Robert Wagner at Fox, directed by Richard Fleischer; and The Decks Ran Red (1958) with James Mason for Andrew L. Stone.

Fed up with the show's hectic shooting schedule, Crawford quit Highway Patrol at the end of 1959 in order to make a film in Spain, and try to get his drinking under control.

Europe
Crawford relocated to Europe where he starred in Vittorio Cottafavi's La vendetta di Ercole (1960), known in the U.S. as Goliath and the Dragon.

Crawford's successful run as Dan Mathews in Highway Patrol earned him some two million dollars under his contract with ZIV, which eventually paid him in exchange for his agreement to sign for the pilot and subsequent production of a new ZIV production, King of Diamonds. Recently back from Europe, and having temporarily stopped drinking, Crawford was signed to play the starring role as diamond industry security chief John King. King of Diamonds was picked up for syndication in 1961, but was a failure, the show lasting only one season.

In 1962, after the end of King of Diamonds, Crawford returned to acting in motion pictures: Square of Violence (1962); Convicts 4 (1962); Javier Setó's The Castilian (1963); A House Is Not a Home (1964); Up from the Beach (1965); Kid Rodelo (1966); The Oscar (1966); The Texican (1966) with Audie Murphy; The Vulture (1967); Red Tomahawk (1967).

1970s
After 1970, Crawford again returned to television. From 1970 to 1971, he played the role of Dr. Peter Goldstone in The Interns.

In 1977, he starred as J. Edgar Hoover in The Private Files of J. Edgar Hoover. He would eventually make a series of guest appearances on several TV programs, while starring in several made-for-TV movies.

He wore the trademark fedora and black suit when he made an appearance as guest host of a 1977 episode of NBC's Saturday Night Live that included a spoof of Highway Patrol.

In an episode of CHiPs Crawford appeared as himself, recognized after being stopped by Officer Poncherello, who presses a reluctant Crawford to give his trademark line from Highway Patrol ("Twenty-One-Fifty to Headquarters!").

Musician Webb Wilder's instrumental, "Ruff Rider" (on the album It Came From Nashville), is dedicated to Broderick Crawford in admiration of his Highway Patrol character's ability to solve any crime committed in California by setting up a road block.

Crawford worked in 140 motion pictures and television series during his career and remained an especially durable presence in television.

Crawford is referenced in the 1977 film Smokey and the Bandit in the scene where an Alabama State Patrol officer angrily confronts Sheriff Buford T. Justice (Jackie Gleason) and his damaged vehicle with its horn that won't stop blaring. When Justice starts to introduce himself, the trooper interrupts him and barks, "I don't care if your name is Broderick Crawford!"

In 1979, Crawford had a cameo as himself in the film A Little Romance in which he referenced his drinking.
In 1981, Crawford played a pawnbroker named 'Slim', on the tv series Vega$, the episode was titled 'Dead Ringer' 

His last role was as a film producer who is murdered in a 1982 episode of the Simon & Simon television series. The actor who played the part of the suspected murderer was Stuart Whitman, who had played the recurring part of Sergeant Walters on Highway Patrol.

Personal life
Throughout his adult life, Crawford was prone to bouts of heavy drinking, and was known for eating large meals. These habits contributed to a serious weight gain for Crawford during the 1950s. 

Crawford's drinking increased during the filming of Highway Patrol, eventually resulting in several arrests and stops for driving under the influence of alcohol (DUI), which eventually gained him a suspended driving license. Eventually the drinking strained the show's relationship with the CHP as well as Crawford's relationship with ZIV.

Fellow actor Stuart Whitman became a close friend of Crawford. In an interview Whitman said they both clicked upon meeting when cast in an episode of Highway Patrol. According to Whitman, who was going through hard financial times, they became fast friends. Crawford would ask Whitman to play his character whenever he was low on cash, so that Whitman would do the dialogue while he was drinking. Whitman said that later down the line he helped to cast Crawford in The Decks Ran Red (1958). Whitman promised the production that Crawford would stay sober throughout the shoot, and he did.

Crawford was married three times; he died in 1986 at the age of 74.

Legacy
 
Crawford has two stars on the Hollywood Walk of Fame, one for motion pictures at 6901 Hollywood Boulevard and another for television at 6734 Hollywood Boulevard.

His popularity on "Highway Patrol" also led to him being memorialized in the poker game of Texas Hold 'em, in that a starting hand of a 10-4 (a common police radio code) is nicknamed a "Broderick Crawford".

Filmography

Woman Chases Man (1937) as Hunk
Start Cheering (1938) as Biff Gordon
Ambush (1939) as Randall
Sudden Money (1939) as Archibald 'Doc' Finney
Undercover Doctor (1939) as Eddie Krator
Beau Geste (1939) as Hank Miller
Island of Lost Men (1939) as Tex Ballister
The Real Glory (1939) as Lieut. Larson
Eternally Yours (1939) as Don Burns
Slightly Honorable (1939) as Russ Sampson
I Can't Give You Anything But Love, Baby (1940) as Michael G. 'Sonny' McGann
When the Daltons Rode (1940) as Bob Dalton
Seven Sinners (1940) as Little Ned
Trail of the Vigilantes (1940) as Swanee
Texas Rangers Ride Again (1940) as Mace Townsley
The Black Cat (1941) as Hubert A. Gilmore 'Gil' Smith
Tight Shoes (1941) as Speedy Miller
Badlands of Dakota (1941) as Bob Holliday
South of Tahiti (1941) as Chuck
North to the Klondike (1942) as John Thorn
Butch Minds the Baby (1942) as Aloysius 'Butch' Grogan
Larceny, Inc. (1942) as Jug Martin
Broadway (1942) as Steve Crandall
Men of Texas (1942) as Henry Clay Jackson
Sin Town (1942) as Dude McNair
Keeping Fit (1942) as Brod – Factory Worker
The Runaround (1946) as Louis Prentiss
Black Angel (1946) as Capt. Flood
Slave Girl (1947) as Chips Jackson
The Flame (1947) as Ernie Hicks
The Time of Your Life (1948) as Krupp (a bewildered policeman)
Sealed Verdict (1948) as Capt. Kinsella
Bad Men of Tombstone (1949) as William Morgan
A Kiss in the Dark (1949) as Mr. Botts
Night Unto Night (1949) as C.L. Shawn
Anna Lucasta (1949) as Frank
All the King's Men (1949) as Willie Stark
Cargo to Capetown (1950) as Johnny Phelan
Convicted (1950) as George Knowland
Born Yesterday (1950) as Harry Brock
Screen Snapshots: Hollywood Awards (1951) as himself
The Mob (1951) as Johnny Damico
Scandal Sheet (1952) as Mark Chapman aka George Grant
Lone Star (1952) as Thomas Craden
Rainbow 'Round My Shoulder (1952) as Broderick Crawford (uncredited)
Stop, You're Killing Me (1952) as Remy Marko
Last of the Comanches (1953) as Sgt. Matt Trainor
The Last Posse (1953) as Sheriff John Frazier
Night People (1954) as Charles Leatherby
Human Desire (1954) as Carl Buckley
Down Three Dark Streets (1954) as FBI Agent John 'Rip' Ripley
New York Confidential (1955) as Charlie Lupo
Big House, U.S.A. (1955) as Rollo Lamar
Not as a Stranger (1955) as Dr. Aarons
Il bidone (1955) as Augusto
Man on a Bus (1955) as Bus driver
The Fastest Gun Alive (1956) as Vinnie Harold
Between Heaven and Hell (1956) as Capt. 'Waco' Grimes - 'G' Co. CO
The Decks Ran Red (1958) as Henry Scott
Bat Masterson (1958 episode "Two Graves for Swan Valley") as Sergeant Foley
Goliath and the Dragon (1960) as King Eurystheus
Square of Violence (1961) as Dr. Stefan Bernardi
Convicts 4 (1962) as Warden
The Virginian (1963 episode "A Killer in Town") as George Wolfe
The Castilian (1963) as Don Sancho
No temas a la ley (1963) as man in hotel (uncredited)
A House Is Not a Home (1964) as Harrigan
Rawhide (1964 episode "Incident at Deadhorse") as condemned man, Jud Hammerklein 
Up from the Beach (1965) as MP Major
Kid Rodelo (1966) as Joe Harbin
 Mutiny at Fort Sharpe (1966) as Colonel Lenox
The Oscar (1966) as sheriff
The Texican (1966) as Luke Starr
The Vulture (1966) as Brian F. Stroud
Red Tomahawk (1967) as Columbus Smith
Ransom Money (1970) as Inspector Joseph Medford
Hell's Bloody Devils (1970) as Gavin
The Naughty Cheerleader (1970) as B.J Hankins
Gregorio and His Angel (1970) as Gregorio
The Yin and the Yang of Mr. Go (1970) as Parker
Embassy (1972) as Frank Dunniger
The Candidate (1972) as Jarmon as narrator (voice, uncredited)
Terror in the Wax Museum (1973) as Amos Burns
The Phantom of Hollywood (1974) as Capt. O'Neal
Won Ton Ton, the Dog Who Saved Hollywood (1976) as special effects man
Look What's Happened to Rosemary's Baby (1976) as Sheriff Holtzman
Mayday at 40,000 Feet! (1976) as Marshal Riese
Proof of the Man (1977) as Police Captain O'Brien
The Private Files of J. Edgar Hoover (1977) as J. Edgar Hoover
The Hughes Mystery (1979)
A Little Romance (1979) as Broderick 'Brod' Crawford
Harlequin (1980) as Doc Wheelan
There Goes the Bride (1980) as gas station attendant
Liar's Moon (1982) as Col. Tubman
 (1982) as Mike Carrady
The Creature Wasn't Nice (1983) as Max the Computer (voice, uncredited) (final film role)
Maharlika (1987; also known as Guerilla Strike Force) as Gen. Hadley

Radio appearances

See also

References

External links

 
 
 Watch Highway Patrol
 Broderick Crawford in Il Bidone
 Profile @ Turner Classic Movies
 

1911 births
1986 deaths
20th-century American male actors
American male film actors
American male radio actors
American male stage actors
American male television actors
Best Actor Academy Award winners
Best Drama Actor Golden Globe (film) winners
Harvard College alumni
Male Western (genre) film actors
Male actors from Philadelphia
Military personnel from Philadelphia
People from Freeport, New York
People from Rancho Mirage, California
United States Army Air Forces non-commissioned officers
United States Army Air Forces personnel of World War II
Western (genre) television actors